The Dai Kannon of Kita no Miyako park (Japanese: 北海道大観音), also known as the Hokkaido Kannon, as well as the Byakue Kannon, is the third-tallest statue in Japan and is the tenth-tallest statue in the world, tied with the Grand Buddha at Ling Shan.

Planning of the statue began in 1975 and construction occurred through 1989. The statue depicts Guanyin (Avalokiteśvara) and is in the Kita no Miyako park on the island of Hokkaido. The statue contains over 20 floors with an elevator, with floors containing shrines and places of worship, eight in total, and a platform providing a panoramic view of the area to visitors.

See also
 Ashibetsu
 Buddhism
 Buddhist art
 Kannon
 List of tallest statues

References

1989 establishments in Japan
1989 sculptures
Buildings and structures in Hokkaido
Colossal Guanyin statues
Colossal statues in Japan
Concrete sculptures
Outdoor sculptures in Japan
Religious buildings and structures completed in 1989
Tourist attractions in Hokkaido